Karina Winter (born 14 January 1986), is an athlete from Germany, who competes in recurve archery and has represented Germany at numerous international World Archery competitions. She won the individual gold medal at the 2009 World Indoor Archery Championships, and achieved a career high ranking of 12 in 2013. In 2015, she won the gold medal at the first European Games in Baku.

References

1986 births
Living people
German female archers
Archers at the 2015 European Games
European Games medalists in archery
European Games gold medalists for Germany
21st-century German women